The Gardeners' Chronicle was a British horticulture periodical. It lasted as a title in its own right for nearly 150 years and is still extant as part of the magazine Horticulture Week.

History
Founded in 1841 by the horticulturists Joseph Paxton, Charles Wentworth Dilke, John Lindley and the printer William Bradbury it originally took the form of a traditional newspaper, with both national and foreign news, but also with vast amounts of material sent in by gardeners and scientists, covering every conceivable aspect of gardening.

Its first editor, John Lindley, was one of the founders. Another founder, Paxton, later also became editor. Prominent contributors included Charles Darwin and Joseph Hooker.

By 1851, the circulation of The Gardeners' Chronicle was given as 6500. Compared with that of the far more eminent Observer at 6230, and The Economist at 3826, The Gardeners' Chronicle did astonishingly well. Possibly these figures include the Chronicle's large international readership.

It was noted for its large advertising section and when the glass tax was abolished in 1845 and the huge interest generated by the Great Exhibition made personal, small-scale greenhouses possible, it became full of adverts for these, many designed by Paxton himself, and from the sales of which he generated a tidy income.

Successive titles 
 1841–1855: The Gardeners' Chronicle
 1856–1873: The Gardeners' Chronicle and Agricultural Gazette
 1874–1886: The Gardeners' Chronicle. New Series (vols. 1–26)
 1887–1956: The Gardeners' Chronicle. Third Series (vols. 1–139)
 1957–1963: Gardeners Chronicle & Gardening Illustrated (vols. 140–154)
 1964–1968: Gardener's Chronicle: The Magazine of Advanced Gardening (vols. 155–164)
 1969–1971: Gardeners' Chronicle & New Horticulturist (vols. 165–170)
 1972–1977: Gardeners' Chronicle: The Horticultural Trade Journal (vols. 171–182)
 1978–1985: Gardeners' Chronicle & Horticultural Trade Journal: The Horticulture & Amenity Weekly  (vols. 183–197)
 1985: Gardeners Chronicle & Horticultural Trade Journal: The Horticulture Week (vol. 198)
 1986 onwards: Horticulture Week (vols. 199–221; no longer numbered since 1997)

See also
List of horticultural magazines

References

External links

 The contemporary Horticulture Week
 The Gardeners' Chronicle at Biodiversity Heritage Library

 The Gardeners' Chronicle links at The Online Books Page

Horticultural magazines published in the United Kingdom
Defunct magazines published in the United Kingdom
Magazines established in 1841
Magazines disestablished in 1986
Joseph Paxton buildings and structures